Walter Cartier (March 29, 1922 – August 17, 1995) was a professional boxer and actor, originally from the Bronx in New York City, New York.

He became a professional boxer after World War II. Film director Stanley Kubrick's first film, Day of the Fight (1951), featured Cartier and his twin brother, Vincent. After this, Walter Cartier tried his hand at acting in other films such as Somebody Up There Likes Me (1956) and television.

Today, he is best known for his role in the classic United States sitcom The Phil Silvers Show, appearing as the mild-mannered Private Claude Dillingham. One memorable first-season episode, "The Boxer,"  introduced Cartier and his boxing skills.

Professional boxing career
As a professional middleweight boxer, Cartier fought some of the best fighters of his era, including Gene Hairston, Billy Kilgore, Garth Panther, Randy Sandy, Bobby Dykes, Gene Boland and Billy Kilroy (all of whom he beat) as well as Pierre Langlois (a ten round draw), Rocky Castellani, and world champions Kid Gavilán, Joey Giardello, Carl Olson and Randy Turpin. The fight with Turpin was controversial; fought on March 17, 1953 at Kensington's  Earl's Court Express in England, it ended with Cartier being disqualified for holding in round two, and his brother Vincent attacked the fight's referee as Walter himself went after Turpin, after the bout was already over. As a result, Cartier was fined 1,000 British pounds.

Cartier, who never fought for a world title despite having faced these four former world champions, finished his professional boxing career with a record of 46 wins, 13 losses and 2 draws (ties); 24 wins and 9 losses were by knockout.

Ancestry
Cartier's ancestry was Irish, his grandfather having changed the family name from McCarthy, initially to Carter, and later to Cartier.

References

External links

1922 births
1995 deaths
American male film actors
American male television actors
Sportspeople from the Bronx
American male boxers
Male actors from New York City
20th-century American male actors
American people of Irish descent
Boxers from New York City